Over is an EP by Jarboe and Telecognac, released in 2000 on Crouton Records.

Track listing

Personnel
Adapted from the Over liner notes.
 Jarboe – lead vocals
 Jon Mueller – keyboards, percussion, engineering, mixing
 Nick Pagan – piano
 Chris Rosenau – clarinet, engineering, mixing

Release history

References 

2000 EPs
Jarboe albums